Keshav Kumar (born 13 December 1988) is an Indian cricketer. He made his first-class debut for Jharkhand against Himachal Pradesh in the 2008–09 Ranji Trophy on 29 November 2008.

Ahead of the 2018–19 Ranji Trophy, he transferred from Jharkhand to Bihar. He was the leading wicket-taker for Bihar in the 2018–19 Vijay Hazare Trophy tournament, with fifteen dismissals in eight matches.

References

External links
 

1988 births
Living people
Indian cricketers
Bihar cricketers
Jharkhand cricketers
Place of birth missing (living people)